The "Contest of Cithaeron and Helicon" (PMG 654) is a fragment of a poem by Corinna.  Preserved on a second-century AD papyrus discovered at Hermopolis in Egypt, the poem tells the story of a singing competition between two mountains, Cithaeron and Helicon, which was apparently won by Mount Cithaeron.

Preservation
The poem is preserved on a second-century AD piece of papyrus, P.Berol. 13284.  The papyrus was discovered by Otto Rubensohn at Hermopolis in 1906.  The papyrus also preserves part of Corinna's poem on the daughters of Asopus.

Poem

The contest poem is about a singing contest between Cithaeron and Helicon. Conflict between these two mountains is known from other sources, but Corinna's poem is the only known mention of a singing contest between the two.  In Corinna's poem, Cithaeron apparently wins the contest; in other versions of the story, Helicon is the victor.

The surviving part of the poem begins with one of the singers – generally thought to be Cithaeron – concluding his song, which tells the myth of how the titan Rhea hid her youngest child, Zeus, from Cronus.  The poem continues with the gods voting on the winner of the contest, and awarding the victory to Cithaeron.  The vote is conducted in a form of secret ballot, using pebbles placed in jars.  It is unknown if actual musical contests were judged in this way, or if Corinna's use of this voting system is intended to recall judicial procedure.  After the result is announced, Helicon throws a down boulder in his anger, which breaks into ten thousand pieces.  John Heath reads this episode as an example of a characteristic sense of humour in Corinna's poetry.

Corinna's use of the story of Rhea and the birth of Zeus in the poem is apparently influenced by Hesiod's account of the same myth in Theogony.  There are several verbal echoes of Hesiod in Corinna's version of the story, though she also adds her own innovations – such as the inclusion of the Curetes, which are not mentioned in the Theogony.  Corinna's version of the poem emphasises the role of Rhea, and Diane Rayor argues that this is an example of Corinna writing for a specifically female audience.

Performance
Corinna's poems were probably mostly written for choral performance in connection with local festivals.  The contest poem may have been written for performance at the Daedala, a festival in honour of Hera at Plataea, which was held in part at the summit of Mount Cithaeron.

References

Works cited
 
 
 
 
 
 
 
 
 

Ancient Greek poems
Boeotian mythology